Ricky Council IV (born August 3, 2001) is an American college basketball player for Arkansas Razorbacks of the Southeastern Conference (SEC).

Early life and high school
Council grew up in Durham, North Carolina and attended Southern School of Energy and Sustainability. He was named third-team All-State as a senior after averaging 23 points, 9.5 rebounds, and 5 assists per game. Council was rated a three-star recruit and committed to play college basketball at Wichita State over offers from Rice, Appalachian State, Elon, Hofstra, UMBC, Georgia Southern, Siena, James Madison, and Coastal Carolina.

College career
Council began his college career at Wichita State. He averaged 7.1 points and 3.4 rebounds over 22 games and was named to the American Athletic Conference (AAC) All-Freshman team. Council played in all 28 of the Shockers' games with seven starts and averaged 12 points, 5.4 rebounds, and 1.1 steals per game and was named the AAC Sixth Man of the Year. Following the end of the season, he initially declared for the 2022 NBA Draft. Council withdrew his name from the draft and entered the NCAA transfer portal.

Council committed to transfer to Arkansas over offers from Kansas, Alabama, Georgia Tech, Mississippi State, and Iowa State.

References

External links
Wichita State Shockers bio
Arkansas Razorbacks bio

2001 births
Living people
African-American basketball players
American men's basketball players
Arkansas Razorbacks men's basketball players
Basketball players from North Carolina
Shooting guards
Sportspeople from Durham, North Carolina
Wichita State Shockers men's basketball players